Fada N’Gourma is a department or commune of Gourma Province in north-eastern Burkina Faso. Its capital is the town of Fada N’Gourma.

Towns and villages

References

Departments of Burkina Faso
Gourma Province